Farouk Tebbal was the Algerian minister for Housing and Urban Planning in the February 1992 government of Sid Ahmed Ghozali under the presidency of Mohammed Boudiaf, then, he kept the same position, in the July 1992 government of  Belaid Abdessalam.

Born June 19, 1946, in Tlemcen, Algeria, Farouk Tebbal is a civil engineer by training. He holds an engineer diploma from École Nationale des Ponts et Chaussées (Paris, France), in June 1970 then a master's degree in structural engineering in 1972 at the University of California, Berkeley, USA.

References

Living people
Year of birth missing (living people)
Government ministers of Algeria
Place of birth missing (living people)
21st-century Algerian politicians